The 1975–76 season was the 20th season of the Liga Nacional de Baloncesto. Real Madrid won the title.

Teams and venues

First stage

Second stage

Title group

Relegation group

Stats Leaders

Points

References

ACB.com 
Linguasport 
1975–76 Spanish Basketball Federation competition archive 

Liga Española de Baloncesto (1957–1983) seasons
   
Spanish